The women's ski halfpipe competition of the FIS Freestyle Ski and Snowboarding World Championships 2015 was held at Kreischberg, Austria on January 21 (qualifying)  and January 22 (finals). 
13 athletes from 8 countries competed.

Qualification
The following are the results of the qualification.

Final
The following are the results of the finals.

References

ski halfpipe, women's